The 2015 Turkmenistan Cup  was the 22nd season of the Turkmenistan Cup knockout tournament. Performed by the system of leaving since the quarterfinals, except commands FC Merw, FC Köpetdag, FC Daşoguz and FC Energetik Türkmenbaşy, they began the tournament with a preliminary stage. The preliminary stage of the tournament was launched August 1, 2015. The final match will held 15 December 2015. The cup champion wins a spot in the 2016 Turkmenistan Supercup final. The cup winner qualified for the 2016 AFC Cup.

Round 1
The Round 1 involves 4 teams. Games played on 1 and 4 August 2015.

|}

Round 2
The Round 2 involves 2 teams. Games played on 12 and 19 August 2015.

|}

Quarterfinals
The quarterfinals involve 8 teams. Games played on 12 and 19 September 2015.

|}

Semifinals
The semifinals involve 4 teams. Games will be played on 24 and 31 October 2015.

|}

Final
Game will be played on 14 December 2015.

See also
2015 Turkmenistan First League 
2015 Ýokary Liga

References 

Turkmenistan Cup
Turkmenistan
Turkmenistan Cup